Imanol Estévez Salas (born 11 January 1993) is a Spanish former cyclist, who competed professionally between 2015 and 2017 for the  team.

Major results
2016
1st Stage 1 Volta ao Alentejo
1st  Young rider classification GP Liberty Seguros

References

External links

1993 births
Living people
Spanish male cyclists
Cyclists from the Basque Country (autonomous community)
Sportspeople from Vitoria-Gasteiz